Lemma Guya Gemeda (1928–2020) was born in 1928 in Ada'a, Oromia, Ethiopia. He was an Ethiopian prior Painting Artist. He provided about ten-thousand of his original works. He was using a goat skin for painting portraits. Lemma died on October 26, 2020 in Addis Ababa, Ethiopia. He had married  Mrs. Aster Bekele in 1960s and had 3 sons, 2 daughters and 8 grandchildren. Lemma's five children are following in his footsteps.

Background

Early life 
Lemma was born on February 13, 1928, in one of woredas in Oromia Region called Ada'a from his father Guya Gemeda and his mother Mare Gobena. At his early age he was obligated to become a cattle herder for his parents were pastoral. In his leisure time he was painting on the wall of his family's house, and he became a mesmerizing icon for his family. He said that his mother's craft works inspired him in childhood to become a painter.

As his painting career grew well, people from surrounding areas positively influenced his father Guya to send his son, Lemma, to school. By the age of 14, in 1942, Lemma went to "Lebna Dengel primary school" which is about 10 Kilometres from his hometown.

Lemma had a great ambition to change the socio economic status of his poor family. For this he aimed to join Teachers Training College. In 1950, Lemma went to Adama Teachers Training College, but did not stay long there. Because it takes seven years to graduate, Lemma left the college and went to his homeland, and painting.

Lemma was not idle, as he was fighting to change his parents' socio economic status. When he was in this situation, he was informed that Haile Selassie I of Ethiopia used to come to Bishoftu in every weekend. Then Lemma decided to go to Bishoftu and show the portraits of a new model of Airplane.

He got a chance to show his work, and his Majesty became surprised by Lemma's work and sent him to Ethiopian Air Force for training. He was trained as Airplane Technician and graduated with great distinction in 1954. Emperor Haile Selassie I of Ethiopia also congratulated Lemma and gifted him painting materials. Then he was sent to Asmara Air Force (when Eretria was under Ethiopia) as a teacher.

Becoming a teacher for Air Force, did not distract his artistic talent. He continued to learn painting in Italian Painting School which was in Asmara, Ethiopia from his own wage. After 11 years, in 1963, Lemma returned to his hometown.

Career 
Lemma began to translate books gifted to him by many foreigners after his return from Asmara, among them "Sil yale astemari" which was the first one. By the time of any modernized printing machine nationally, Lemma became a good printer to multiply and distribute colorfully painted portraits of Ethiopian nations and nationalities, especially Oromo people.

Among his notable work 'Kuwanta' has become very meaningful. On this portrait, Lemma tried to glimpse Africa's natural resource corruption. On this portrait there are 2 cats looking at meat that hung on horizontally tied rope.

Awards 
Lemma's paintings have been exhibited and sold successfully in America, Sweden, United Kingdom, Nigeria, Kenya and Senegal and let him win numerous prizes and awards. Lemma was awarded as "a man who is an author of notable work which glimpse three generations" by Native American Heritage Association. For his contribution to the society of Oromia the University of Jimma also awarded him Honorary Doctorate.

Death 
Lemma had become sick since 2018, and was supported by national and international doctors. But on October 26, 2020 he died in Addis Ababa, Ethiopia. Ethiopian News Agency on his official website noted that "Famous Ethiopian Painter Lemma Guya Dies at 92".

References 

1928 births
2020 deaths
20th-century Ethiopian painters
21st-century painters
20th-century male artists
21st-century male artists
People from Oromia Region